Art Official Age is the thirty-seventh studio album by American recording artist Prince. It was released on September 26, 2014 by NPG Records under a renewed license to Warner Bros. Records, marking the second collaboration of both parties since 1995's The Gold Experience.

Prince released the album Plectrumelectrum, recorded with his touring band 3rdeyegirl, simultaneously.

Commercial performance
Art Official Age debuted at number five on the Billboard 200 and sold 51,000 copies in its first week. In its second week of sales, the album dropped to number 22 on the chart, selling 15,000 copies, bringing the total to 66,000 copies.

Critical reception 

Art Official Age received generally positive reviews from music critics. At Metacritic, which assigns a normalized rating out of 100 to reviews from mainstream critics, the album received an average score of 70, based on 24 reviews. In his review for the Chicago Tribune, Greg Kot said that it is "a more substantial and stranger album" than Plectrumelectrum. Randall Roberts of the Los Angeles Times called it "an exquisite Prince R&B album", while The Daily Telegraphs Neil McCormick said it is "a slick, seductive electro funk sci-fi concept album". Kitty Empire was favorable toward Prince's use of digital production in her review for The Observer and called it "a far better album than you'd dare hope from the latterday Prince". Billboard magazine's Kenneth Partridge said Prince is "funnier, sexier, and more self-aware than he's been in ages" and that the album is his most creative since the 1990s.

In a less enthusiastic review for AllMusic, Stephen Thomas Erlewine wrote that Art Official Age is a "full-fledged R&B album" in the vein of Prince's work with the New Power Generation, but some of his "modernization feels a bit ham-fisted". Q magazine was more critical and dismissed it as "an overlong, pan-generic concept album", while Jon Pareles of The New York Times said its songs lack memorable melodies despite the "musicianly ingenuity" of their production. Pareles added that it abandons the concept established by the album's first few songs and interludes, which have Prince "waking up from suspended animation 45 years from now". Robert Christgau cited "Breakfast Can Wait" and "FunknRoll" as highlights in his review for Cuepoint, facetiously remarking, "our greatest composer-performer of romantic nu-funk erotica wakes up 40 years later wishing he was Janelle Monáe".

Track listing

Notes
 All track titles are stylized in all uppercase, except for affirmation I & II & affirmation III.

Charts

Weekly charts

Year-end charts

References

External links 
 

2014 albums
Prince (musician) albums
Albums produced by Prince (musician)
Concept albums
NPG Records albums
Warner Records albums